The Cook's Ferry First Nation is a Nlaka'pamux First Nations government, located in the Central Interior region of the Canadian province of British Columbia.  It is no longer a member of the Scw'exmx Tribal Council, because they were voted out (which is a tribal council of the Nlaka'pamux people).  Other Nlaka'pamux governments belong either to the Fraser Canyon Indian Administration or the Nlaka'pamux Nation Tribal Council (except for the Lytton First Nation, which is unaffiliated).

The Cook's Ferry First Nation reserve community and offices are located near Spences Bridge, a small town on the Trans-Canada Highway (Hwy 1) in the Thompson Canyon between Lytton and Cache Creek, at the confluence of the Nicola River and the Thompson.

Indian Reserves
Cook's Ferry Indian Band has jurisdiction over the following reserves:
 Kumcheen 1 - 69.7 Ha - 18 Dwellings 
 Skoonkoon 2 - 17.4 Ha - 0 Dwellings
 Shawniken 3 - 13.8 Ha - 0 Dwellings
 Spences Bridge 4 - 11.7 Ha - 2 Dwellings
 Lower Shawniken 4A 
 Shawniken 4B - 13.4 Ha - 8 Dwellings
 Spences Bridge 4C - 10.4 Ha - 3 Dwellings
 Chuchhriaschin 5 - 8.1 Ha - 0 Dwellings
 Chuchhriaschin 5A - 8.1 Ha - 0 Dwellings
 Nicoelton 6 - 812.8 Ha - 0 Dwellings
 Kloklowuck 7 - 83.8 Ha - 3 Dwellings
 Tsinkahtl 8 - 5.2 Ha - 0 Dwellings
 Upper Tsinkahtl 8A - 4.1 Ha - 0 Dwellings
 Pemynoos 9 - 1823.3 Ha - 5 Dwellings
 Pokheitsk 10 - 8.7 Ha - 0 Dwellings
 Spatsum 11 - 65.8 Ha - 0 Dwellings
 Spatsum 11A - 70.3 Ha - 0 Dwellings
 Schikaelton 16 - 0.2 Ha - 0 Dwellings
 Twoyqhalsht 16 - 11.1 Ha - 1 Dwellings
 Lish-Leesh-Tum 17 - 18.9 Ha - 0 Dwellings
 Basque 18 - 428.4 Ha - 3 Dwellings
 Entlqwekkinh 19 - 64.8 Ha - 3 Dwellings
 Shpapzchinh 20 - 210.4 Ha - 0 Dwellings
 Antko 21 (Merritt) - 14.2 Ha - 0 Dwellings
 Peq-Paq 22 - 186.1 Ha - 0 Dwellings

Total: 3960.7 Ha - 46 Dwellings

See also
Nicola (chief)
Thompson language

References

External links
Indian and Northern Affairs Canada - First Nation Detail

Nlaka'pamux governments
Thompson Country